The Raleigh Runnels Memorial Pool is an aquatics venue located on the campus of Pepperdine University in Malibu, California. The pool was constructed in 1975 and dedicated the following year to Raleigh Neal Runnels, the son of Pepperdine Chancellor Dr. Charles Runnels, who died of cancer at 17.

The pool hosted the water polo competitions for the 1984 Summer Olympics in neighboring Los Angeles.

References

Buildings and structures in Malibu, California
Sports in Malibu, California
Venues of the 1984 Summer Olympics
Olympic water polo venues
College swimming venues in the United States
Pepperdine Waves
Swimming venues in California
1975 establishments in California
Sports venues completed in 1975